Simin Keramati (born 1970) is an Iranian-born Canadian multidisciplinary visual artist and activist. She is primarily known as a painter, video artist, installation artist, and filmmaker. Keramati lives in Toronto.

Biography 
Simin Keramati was born in 1970 in Tehran, Iran. She attended Islamic Azad University, where she received a B.A. degree (1995) in English; and the Tehran University of Art, where she received a M.A. degree (1996) in painting. She moved to Toronto in 2013, where she attended George Brown College.

Keramati's art work focuses on socio-political topics, identity, and the injustices facing women in Iran. Some of her art contemporaries include Shirin Neshat, Shadi Ghadirian, and Newsha Tavakolian.

In 2009, Keramati was part of the group exhibition, Made in Iran, curated by Arianne Levene and Eglantine de Ganay and held at the Asia House, London; other artists in the show included Nazgol Ansarinia, Shirin Aliabadi, Behrouz Rae, Vahid Sharifian, Peyman Hooshmandzadeh, and Arash Hanaei. Her work was part of the group exhibition, Art Brief IV: Iranian Contemporary San Francisco (2018) held at SOMA Arts in San Francisco, created in conjunction with the nonprofit group Moms Against Poverty (MAP).

In September 2022, during the Mahsa Amini protests she helped organize the protest event outside of the Legislative Assembly of Ontario, and Keramati also created a notable protest poster.

See also 
 List of Iranian women artists

References

External links 
 Official website 
 

1970 births
Artists from Tehran
Artists from Toronto
Iranian women artists
Iranian women activists
Iranian emigrants to Canada
Islamic Azad University alumni
Tehran University of Art alumni
Canadian women painters
Canadian video artists
Iranian video artists
George Brown College alumni
Living people
Mahsa Amini protests